In mathematics, specifically the algebraic theory of fields, a normal basis is a special kind of basis for Galois extensions of finite degree, characterised as forming a single orbit for the Galois group.  The normal basis theorem states that any finite Galois extension of fields has a normal basis. In algebraic number theory, the study of the more refined question of the existence of a normal integral basis is part of Galois module theory.

Normal basis theorem
Let  be a Galois extension with Galois group .

A normal basis contrasts with a primitive element basis of the form , where  is an element whose minimal polynomial has degree .

Group representation point of view
A field extension  with Galois group G can be naturally viewed as a representation of the group G over the field F in which each automorphism is represented by itself. Representations of G over the field F can be viewed as left modules for the group algebra . In terms of representations of G over F, this means that K is isomorphic to the regular representation.

Case of finite fields 
For finite fields this can be stated as follows: Let  denote the field of q elements, where q = pm is a prime power, and let  denote its extension field of degree n ≥ 1.

is a basis of K over F.

Proof for finite fields 
The first is the linear independence of characters: a multiplicative character is a mapping χ from a group H to a field K satisfying ; then any distinct characters  are linearly independent in the K-vector space of mappings. We apply this to the Galois group automorphisms  thought of as mappings from the multiplicative group . Now  as an F-vector space, so we may consider  as an element of the matrix algebra  since its powers  are linearly independent (over K and a fortiori over F), its minimal polynomial must have degree at least n, i.e. it must be .

In the first case , in the second case . (Note this is  an isomorphism of F-linear spaces, but not of rings or F-algebras!) This gives isomorphism of -modules  that we talked about above, and under it the basis  on the right side corresponds to a normal basis  of K on the left.

Note that this proof would also apply in the case of a cyclic Kummer extension.

Example 
The proof above clarifies the choice of normal bases in terms of the structure of K as a representation of G (or F[G]-module). The irreducible factorization 
 means we have a direct sum of F[G]-modules (by the Chinese remainder theorem):
The first component is just , while the second is isomorphic as an F[G]-module to  under the action  (Thus  as F[G]-modules, but not as F-algebras.)

In terms of the G-orbits of K, which correspond to the irreducible factors of:

By contrast, for the extension field  in which n = 4 is divisible by p = 2, we have the F[G]-module isomorphism 

Application to cryptography 
The normal basis is frequently used in cryptographic applications based on the discrete logarithm problem, such as elliptic curve cryptography, since arithmetic using a normal basis is typically more computationally efficient than using other bases.

where the coefficients are bits  Now we can square elements by doing a left circular shift, since squaring β4 gives β8 = β.  This makes the normal basis especially attractive for cryptosystems that utilize frequent squaring.

Proof for the case of infinite fields
Let us write . 's (monic) minimal polynomial f over K is the irreducible degree n polynomial given by the formula
Since f is separable (it has simple roots) we may define 

In other words,

Next, define an  matrix A of polynomials over K and a polynomial D by

Therefore, . We see that D is a non-zero polynomial, and therefore it has only a finite number of roots. Since we assumed F is infinite, we can find  such that . Define

We claim that  is a normal basis. Applying the automorphism  yields  for all i. In other words, . Since , we conclude that , which completes the proof.

It is tempting to take  because . But this is impermissible because we used the fact that  to conclude that for any F-automorphism  and polynomial  over  the value of the polynomial  at  equals .

Primitive normal basis
A primitive normal basis of an extension of finite fields E/F is a normal basis for E/F that is generated by a primitive element of E, that is a generator of the multiplicative group . (Note that this is a more restrictive definition of primitive element than that mentioned above after the general Normal Basis Theorem: one requires powers of the element to produce every non-zero element of K, not merely a basis.)  Lenstra and Schoof (1987) proved that every finite field extension possesses a primitive normal basis, the case when F is a prime field having been settled by Harold Davenport.

Free elements
If K/F is a Galois extension and x in K generates a normal basis over F, then x is free in K/F.  If x has the property that for every subgroup H of the Galois  group G, with fixed field KH, x is free for K/KH, then x is said to be completely free in K/F.  Every Galois extension has a completely free element.

See also
Dual basis in a field extension
Polynomial basis
Zech's logarithm

References

 
 
 

Linear algebra
Field (mathematics)
Abstract algebra
Cryptography